Fuad Hasan oglu Abdurahmanov (May 11, 1915 in Nukha (Sheki), Azerbaijan, Russian Empire – June 15, 1971 in Baku, Azerbaijan SSR, USSR) was a popular Azerbaijani monument sculptor. He received many awards, including: Honored Worker of Arts of the Azerbaijan SSR (1943), People's Artist of the Azerbaijan SSR (1955), the first Azerbaijani to become a corresponding member of the Academy of Arts of the USSR (1949), and Laureate of the State Stalin Prize two times (1947, 1951).

Biography

Fuad Abdurahmanov was born on May 11, 1915, in Nukha (Sheki). He was born into the family of Hasan Jafar oglu Abdurahmanov, a local civil servant.

In 1929, Abdurahmanov’s family moved to Yevlakh and later relocated to Baku. In Baku, the family of the future sculptor rented a two-room apartment in Icheri Sheher, on Mammadyarov street. 1929 became an important year for Fuad. This was the year that he entered the Painting School of Baku. After beginning his studies in Baku, he later studied at the Academy of Arts in Saint Petersburg (1935–1940) at Matvey Genrikhovich Manizer.

In 1934, twelve-year-old Fuad Abdurahmanov’s composition, Shot, was exhibited in an exhibition dedicated to the 100th anniversary of the poet Ferdowsi. This later became a permanent exhibit in the Azerbaijan State Museum of Art, named after Rustam Mustafayev. In 1938, Fuad Abdurahmanov began to work on Fuzûlî’s statue opening a pantheon of eminent Azerbaijani poets and writers established on Nizami Museum’s loggia in Baku. A contest for the best pictorial portrait and monument of Nizami Ganjavi declared in connection with 800th anniversary had a great importance at the end of the 1930s. As a result of the contest, the project was awarded to Fuad Abdurahmanov and architects Sadig Dadashov and Mikayil Huseynov.

In 1947, he was awarded the USSR-Stalin State Prize for the first time of his life. In 1949, a monument to Nizami was erected in Baku. This monument is “cultic” not only in Abdurahmanov’s creativity, but it also had a great influence on future development of monumental art of Azerbaijan. Both the monument and pedestal had successful proportions of 1:1,5, defining architectural appearance of one of the best squares of Baku. Creative interests of the sculptor were multi-sided, which can be seen in his later works—images of Huseynbala  Aliyev, Khidir Mustafayev (heroes of the USSR, poet Samad Vurgun, composers Uzeyir Hajibeyov and Asaf Zeynally, historical portraits of Koroghlu, Javanshir, Babek). He was awarded (with Tokay Mammadov and Omar Eldarov) on the contest of a monument to Avicenna for Bukhara city. Fuad Abdurahmanov is the first Azerbaijani who became the corresponding member of the Academy of Arts of the USSR. He was one of the first sculptors of Azerbaijan who worked with hard materials.

Creative achievements

He created monuments to Nizami in Ganja (Stalin State Prize, 1947) and Baku (1949), compositions “Sattar Bahlulzade”, “Rustam Mustafayev” (1947), monument “Azad Gadin” (Free woman), monument to Mehdi Huseynzade in Baku, monumental busts of Choibalsan and Sukhbaatar (marble, 1954, burial vault in Ulan Bator), monuments to poet Samad Vurghun in Baku (1961), to poet Rudaki in Dushanbe (Gold medal of Academy of Arts of the USSR, 1964), statues “Liberation” (Baku, 1960), “Chaban” (gypsum, Stalin State Prize, 1951; bronze, 1951, Tretyakov Gallery). He made a portrait bust of V.I.Lenin (marble, 1955, Azerbaijan State Museum of History, Baku) and others.

His works are distinguished for their richness and diversity of creative tendencies. Abdurahmanov began his creative development in the portrait genre, by making bust-portraits of cultural workers of Azerbaijan. His first monumental work-monument to Fuzuli was put up on the balcony of the Azerbaijan State Museum of Literature. Fuad Abdurahmanov is the author of a lot of monuments decorating streets and squares of Baku-Nizami—Samed Vurghun, Mehdi Huseynzade, “To emancipated woman", and the gravestone of General Hazi Aslanov. Abdurahmanov made a great contribution to the formation and development of monumental and easel plastics of Azerbaijan. According to one of the leading art critics of Azerbaijan, Jamila Novruzova, Fuad Abdurakhmanov is founder of monumental sculpture in Azerbaijan. After Fuad Abdurahmanov were named streets in Baku and Sheki, memorial plates were put up on buildings where the sculptor lived. A school in Sheki was also named after him.

Awards
 Stalin State Prize of the second degree (1947) – for the monument to Nizami in Ganja (1946);
 Stalin State Prize of the third degree (1951) – for the sculpture "Chaban";
 Gold medal of Academy of Arts of the USSR (1966);
 Holder of two Orders of the Badge of Honour (1949, 1960).

References 

1915 births
1971 deaths
Soviet sculptors
Azerbaijani sculptors
Soviet painters
Azerbaijani painters
Azerbaijani portrait painters
Stalin Prize winners
People from Shaki, Azerbaijan
20th-century Azerbaijani sculptors
Honored Art Workers of the Azerbaijan SSR
Fuad Abdurahmanov